The Philippines competed at the 1956 Summer Olympics in Melbourne, Australia. 39 competitors, 35 men and 4 women, took part in 30 events in 7 sports.

A resolution was filed at the Philippine Congress which sought a Philippine boycott of the 1956 Summer Olympics as a protest against the White Australia policy which targeted immigrants with an Asian background. The country nevertheless participated at the Games.

The Philippine Amateur Athletic Federation (PAAF) named the 39 athletes and four coaches in a special luncheon meeting at the Philippine Columbian Clubhouse. Antonio de las Alas, PAAF President, headed the Philippine delegation to Melbourne.

Philippine Olympic team lineups

Basketball: 
Carlos Badion
Rafael Barretto
Ramoncito Campos
Loreto Carbonell
Antonio Genato (c)
Eduardo "Eddie" Lim
Carlos "Caloy" Loyzaga
Ramón Manulat
Leonardo Marquicias
Mariano Tolentino
Martin Urra
Antonio Villamor
Coach: Leo Prieto
Track and Field:
Pablo Somblingo (400-meter hurdles)
Ciriaco Baronda (high jump)
Manolita Cinco and Francisca Sanopal (80-meter hurdles)
Coach: Jose Ravello
Swimming:
Bana Sailani (400-meter freestyle and 1,500-meter freestyle)
Parsons Nabiula (200-meter breastroke and 200-meter butterfly)
Agapito Lozada (200-meter butterfly)
Pedro Cayco (100-meter backstroke)
Dakula Arabani (200-meter freestyle)
Gertrudez Lozada (100-meter freestyle and 400-meter freestyle)
Jocelyn Von Giese (100-meter backstroke)
Coach: Edilberto Bonus
Boxing:
Federico Bonus (Flyweight)
Alberto Adela (Bantamweight)
Paulino Melendrez (Featherweight)
Celedonio Espinosa (Lightweight)
Manuel delos Santos (Middleweight)
Coach: Celestino Enriquez
Wrestling:
Nicolas Arcales (Middleweight, acting coach)
Mateo Tanaquin (Lightweight)
Ernesto Ramel (Bantamweight)
Weightlifting:
Pedro Landero (Bantamweight)
Rodrigo del Rosario (Featherweight)
Shooting:
Teodoro Kalaw, Jr (Team Captain)
Cesar Jayme
Martin Gison
Ricardo Hizon
Hernando Castelo
Enrique Beech

Athletics

Basketball

Preliminary Round (Group A)
 Defeated Thailand (55-44)
 Defeated Japan (76-61)
 Lost to United States (53-121)
Quarterfinals (Group A)
 Lost to Uruguay (70-79)
 Defeated France (65-58)
 Lost to Chile (69-88)
Classification 5-8
 Lost to Bulgaria (70-80)
Classification 7/8
 Defeated Chile (75-58) → did not advance, 7th place

Boxing

Shooting

Five sport shooters, all male, represented the Philippines in 1956.

25 m pistol
 Martin Gison

50 m pistol
 Ricardo Hizon

300 m rifle, three positions
 Martin Gison

50 m rifle, prone
 Hernando Castelo
 César Jayme

Trap
 Enrique Beech

Swimming

Weightlifting

Wrestling

References

External links
Official Olympic Reports

Nations at the 1956 Summer Olympics
1956
Summer Olympics